Vedshanker is an Indian music composer. A former student of A. R. Rahman's school. he made his debut in the Tamil film Paalai (2010) and then made a breakthrough with his work in Naduvula Konjam Pakkatha Kaanom (2012).

Career
Ved Shankar was a student of A. R. Rahman’s KM Music Conservatory, and was one of 15 students selected for training in western classical music at North Eastern University, Boston, funded by the U.S. Department of State. He then trained as a sound designer and was nominated for the META award for Most Innovative Sound Design 2012, be completing his MBA at IIPM, Chennai. His first album was for the period film, Paalai (2011), and then worked on the album for Madhubana Kadai (2012). Ved Shankar made his breakthrough with his work in Balaji Tharaneetharan's Naduvula Konjam Pakkatha Kaanom, which on critical acclaim and performed well at the box office. Moreover, his work in the promotional song "Crazy Penne" featuring Andrea Jeremiah also won critical acclaim, and he was featured in a list of top music directors in a year end ranking by Behindwoods.com in 2012.

Discography

Released soundtracks
 The films are listed in the order that the music released, regardless of the date the film released.
 The year next to the title of the affected films indicates the release year of the either dubbed or remade version in the named language later than the original version.
 • indicates original language release. Indicates simultaneous makes, if featuring in more languages
 ♦ indicates a remade version, the remaining ones being dubbed versions

Films

Independent songs

Webseries

Upcoming projects

References

Living people
Tamil musicians
Tamil film score composers
Indian Institute of Planning and Management alumni
Year of birth missing (living people)